Soilbleed is the second album EP release by Dutch Aggrotech band, Grendel. It was released in Europe on April 25, 2005, through NoiTekk Records and in the United States on October 5, 2005, through Metropolis Records.

Track 3, "Zombienation (V.2K5)" is a cover of Kernkraft 400 by German techno band Zombie Nation.

Track listing

References

2005 EPs
Grendel (band) albums